Kristian Jebsens Rederi usually known as the Jebsen Group or KJR has business activities ranging from ship owning, ship commercial operations, technical and crew management. The group employs 250+ on-shore personnel plus over 15,000 seafarers in their pool serving the global shipping industry. Jebsens core shipping activities focus on the transport of dry bulk commodities in Europe, the Far East, Australia and the Pacific North American Coast for industrial clients with the use of tonnage ranging from Small Handysize up to Panamax vessels, both Self-unloaders and conventional.

The group is currently headed by Bjørn Jebsen (3rd. generation) who became chairman in 2009.

History
Jebsens was founded in 1929 by Kristian Jebsen under the banner of Kristian Jebsens Rederi AS (KJR) in Bergen. Operations began with its first two 2,500 dwt newbuildings. One of them, MV Vigsnes, pictured on the right. The company grew steadily through the 1930s, emerging from World War II as a small shipping company with majority interest in small bulk carriers and medium-sized tankers. In the 1950s, KJR expanded its fleet with 15,000 to 22,000 tonners, the Handysize bulk carriers of that time.

When Atle Jebsen, became President of the company in 1967, KJR sold its tankers. From then on, the business focused on operating bulk carriers through long-lasting contracts with commercial partners. In the past two decades, its niche market is served by specialized self-discharging vessels known as the Beltships which has a proven efficiency in short sea trading. Jebsens is a shipping industry pioneer in developing joint ventures both with customers, with other shipping companies and developing markets. This philosophy, initiated by its founder, has continued with success. The Group grew to become a major player in the Norwegian and international shipping scene, with a strong focus in the Far East. It has held a long strategic joint venture, the AboJeb Group in the Philippines, which has become a major technical and crew management service provider in the region (formerly the Aboitiz Jebsen Group).

References

Defunct shipping companies of Norway
Dry bulk shipping companies
Transport companies of Vestland
Companies based in Bergen
Transport companies established in 1929
1929 establishments in Norway
Transport companies disestablished in 1993
1993 disestablishments in Norway